Ďurďové is a village and municipality in Považská Bystrica District in the Trenčín Region of north-western Slovakia.

History
In historical records the village was first mentioned in 1393.

Geography
The municipality lies at an elevation of 381 metres (1,250 ft) and covers an area of 4.815 km² (1.859 mi²). It has a population of about 192.

Genealogical resources

The records for genealogical research are available at the state archive "Statny Archiv in Bytca, Slovakia"

 Roman Catholic church records (births/marriages/deaths): 1788-1948 (parish B)

See also
 List of municipalities and towns in Slovakia

External links
 
http://www.statistics.sk/mosmis/eng/run.html
Surnames of living people in Durdove

Villages and municipalities in Považská Bystrica District